The 2019 Norwegian Athletics Championships was the year's national outdoor track and field championships for Norway. It was held from 2–4 August at the Hamar Idrettspark in Børstad, Hamar Municipality.  It was organised by FIK Orion and Hamar IL.

The King's trophy was awarded to women's distance runner Karoline Bjerkeli Grøvdal and hurdler Karsten Warholm (who also set a championship record in the 400 metres sprint). Warholm became the first man to win the trophy five years in a row. Javelin thrower Egil Danielsen, who died shortly before the competition, was honoured in the opening ceremony and a statue was placed outside of the stadium in Hamar.

Championships
The following senior championships were held outside the main championships: [1]

Results

Men

Women

References

Results
 Results day 1 
 Results day 2 
 Results day 3 
 Results Relay

External links
 Official website 

Norwegian Athletics Championships
Norwegian Athletics Championships
Norwegian Athletics Championships
Norwegian Athletics Championships
Sport in Hamar